Tatta Pani is village with a natural hot water sulfur spring located in the Kalakote tehsil of Rajouri district in the Indian union territory of Jammu and Kashmir. The hot spring is situated near the Pir Panjal Range and is approximately  kilometers away from Kalakote.

Etymology 
Tatta Pani word itself means hot water in Pahari language where Tatta stands for hot and Pani stands for Pani. So because of hot water spring, the village named as Tatta Pani.

Geography 
The village is located at an altitude of approximately 1,500 meters above sea level and is surrounded by lush green forests. Tatta Pani has a humid subtropical, dry climate. Its yearly temperature is 28.16 °C (82.69 °F) and it is 2.19% higher than India’s averages. It typically receives about 22.15 millimeters (0.87 inches) of precipitation and has 28.48 rainy days (7.8% of the time) annually. Pincode of Tatta Pani is 185202.

Medical importance 
The water is said to have medicinal properties and spring has medicinal property to cure bone, joint and skin ailment. Many tourists visit Tata Pani to take a dip in the hot water and enjoy its therapeutic benefits. The hot spring is also a popular picnic spot and attracts a large number of visitors during the summer months. There are several small shops and eateries located near Tata Pani where visitors can buy refreshments and souvenirs.

See also 

 Rajouri
 Kalakote
 Tourism in Jammu and Kashmir

References

Villages in Rajouri district
Villages in India